Mount Gilead High School is a public high school in Mount Gilead, Ohio.  It is the only high school in the Mount Gilead Exempted Village Schools district.  Their nickname is the Indians. The school currently is under superintendent Dr. Zack Howard. The school uses three buildings for students: Park Avenue, a K-5 building; Cherry Street (admin. bldg.), a middle school containing 6–8; and the High School, also located on Park Avenue. Over the past four years the Cross Country team has participated in the state tournament. In 2002 Jake Haughn won the Division III OHSAA 3200 Meter run title in track, at the  time setting a new record.
The School has a long-standing and fierce rivalry with Cardington-Lincoln High School.

Ohio High School Athletic Association State Championships

 Boys Golf – 1985 
Boys Cross Country - State Champions 2022; State Runner-Up - 2019, 2021
Girls Cross Country - State Runner-Up - 2017
Boys Track - State Champion - 1970 Jerry Staley (180 Low Hurdles); 1974 Monty Ward (440 Dash); 1975 Monty Ward (440 Dash); 2002 Jake Haughn (3200m Run); 2017 Austin Hallabrin (800m Run); 2019 Bradley Landon (Seated Shot Put)
Girls Track - State Champion - 2019 Allison Johnson (800m Run); 2020 Kelsey Kennon (Indoor Shot Put); 2020 Allison Johnson (Indoor 800m Run); 2021 Allison Johnson (Indoor 800m Run); 2021 Allison Johnson (Indoor 1600m Run); 2021 Michaela McGill,Olivia Millisor,Emily Hanft,Allison Johnson (3200 Relay); 2021 Allison Johnson (800m Run); 2021 Allison Johnson (1600m Run)
Girls Track Team State Runner Up - 2021

References

External links
 District website

Mount Gilead, Ohio
High schools in Morrow County, Ohio
Public high schools in Ohio